The statue honoring aviatrix Amelia Earhart  was unveiled in the United States Capitol in Washington, D.C., representing Kansas in the National Statuary Hall Collection on July 27, 2022. 

The statue is made of bronze and was cast by brothers Mark and George Lundeen using the lost-wax process.

The statue replaced one of Kansas statesman John James Ingalls in the collection as the second representative of Kansas, after famed general and U.S. President Dwight Eisenhower.

References

Amelia Earhart
Bronze sculptures in Washington, D.C.
Earhart, Amelia
Monuments and memorials in Washington, D.C.
Sculptures of women in Washington, D.C.